The 2015–16 PlusLiga was the 80th season of the Polish Volleyball Championship, the 16th season as a professional league organized by the Professional Volleyball League SA under the supervision of the Polish Volleyball Federation.

ZAKSA Kędzierzyn-Koźle won their 6th title of the Polish Champions, the first title since 2003.

Regular season

|}

1st round

|}

2nd round

|}

3rd round

|}

4th round

|}

5th round

|}

6th round

|}

7th round

|}

8th round

|}

9th round

|}

10th round

|}

11th round

|}

12th round

|}
|}

13th round

|}

14th round

|}

15th round

|}

16th round

|}

17th round

|}

18th round

|}

19th round

|}

20th round

|}

21st round

|}

22nd round

|}

23rd round

|}

24th round

|}

25th round

|}

26th round

|}

Final round
13th place
(to 2 victories)

|}

11th place
(to 2 victories)

|}

9th place
(to 2 victories)

|}

7th place
(to 2 victories)

|}

5th place
(to 2 victories)

|}

3rd place
(to 3 victories)

|}

Finals
(to 3 victories)

|}

Final standings

Squads

See also
 2015–16 CEV Champions League
 2015–16 CEV Cup

References

External links
 Official website 

PlusLiga
Poland
Plusliga
Plusliga
Plusliga
Plusliga